Alaena ngonga, the Ngong Zulu, is a butterfly in the family Lycaenidae. It is found in central Kenya and Tanzania (Masai and Serengeti). The habitat consists of rocky hillsides in savanna.

References

Butterflies described in 1966
Alaena